Pranayavarnangal is an Indian Malayalam-language soap opera directed by K. K. Rajeev. The show premiered on 18 October 2021 on Zee Keralam and streams on-demand through ZEE5. The show is an official remake of Bengali series Ki Kore Bolbo Tomay. It portrays the love story of a fashion tycoon, Siddharth (Richard Jose) and his creative head, Aparna (Swathy Nithyanand).

Cast

Main
 Richard Jose as Siddharth Narayanan (Siddhu)
 Swathy Nithyanand as Aparna Murali (Appu)

Recurring
 Divyadarshan as Balu Shankar (Balu)
 Ameya Nair as Riya
 Jismy as Thanusree (Thanu)
 Manju Satheesh as Amala Shankar (Aami)
 Lishoy as Sethupathi Narayan
 Manju Pathrose  as Swayam Prabha
 E .A. Rajendran as Madhu Shankar
 Chinthu P as Sharath Das
 Joobi as Rukmini
 Sreelakshmi as Prathibha
 Jayachandran as Sathyardha Narayanan
 Greeshma as Swetha
 Shifa Yaazir	
 Sajna Firoz as Bhavana 
 Fawas as Shivakumar
 Veda Biju as Diya
 Shylaja Sreedharan Nair as Manju Sethupathi Narayan
 Kripa as Kripa
 Vijayakumari

Guest
 Ajay Vasudev as Himself
 Arun G Raghavan as Dev Krishna (DK)
 Meghna Vincent as Jyothirmayi (Jyothi)

Production

Development
Pranayavarnangal is an official remake of Bengali television show Ki Kore Bolbo Tomay.

Casting
Lead actor Richard Jose lost almost 7 kg and grew his hair to transform as his character. He played Siddharth, a leading fashion designer. Swathy Nithyanand plays the female lead, Aparna. The show is directed by K. K. Rajeev.

Integration episodes
Lead actors Richard Jose and Swathy Nithyanand made guest appearances as their characters, Siddharth and Aparna in soap operas Kaiyethum Doorath and Mrs. Hitler, both in 2022.

Soundtrack

Reception
Reviewing the first episode of the show, a reviewer from The Times of India defined the show as, "a romantic tale in the backdrop of the stylish fashion industry". The reviewer praised the introduction scenes of the two leads, Aparna and Siddharth and also appreciated the other castings.

In a poll conducted on the official Instagram account of ETimes TV to pick the best entertainer between Thumbapoo and Pranayavarnangal, 69% of the respondents voted in favour of Pranayavarnangal.

Adaptations

References

External links
 Official website 
 

Indian drama television series
Indian television soap operas
Indian television series
Malayalam-language television shows
2021 Indian television series debuts
Zee Keralam original programming